Sandler may refer to:

Sandler (surname)
 Lowenstein Sandler, corporate law firm
 Sandler O'Neill and Partners, New York City-based investment banking firm
 Sandler and Young, singing team from the 1960s to the '80s with Tony Sandler and Ralph Young
 Sandler Award, genetics dissertation award